Carrboro Commercial Historic District is a national historic district located at Carrboro, Orange County, North Carolina.  The district encompasses 12 contributing buildings in the central business district of Carrboro.  The district's buildings date from about 1910 to the mid-1920s and are primarily one- and two-story brick commercial buildings.  Notable buildings include the "Flatiron Building" (c. 1920), Hearn's Grocery (1924), a Bank and Jewelry Store (c. 1920-1924), the Miles Andrews House (c. 1910), Western Auto Store (c. 1924), and the building at 118-120 East Main Street (c. 1917-1920).

It was listed on the National Register of Historic Places in 1985.

References

Commercial buildings on the National Register of Historic Places in North Carolina
Historic districts on the National Register of Historic Places in North Carolina
Buildings and structures in Chapel Hill-Carrboro, North Carolina
National Register of Historic Places in Orange County, North Carolina